Syngnathia is a congenital adhesion of the maxilla and mandible by fibrous bands.

References

Congenital disorders of musculoskeletal system